Gunther Mende (born June 4, 1952 in Wiesbaden Germany) is a German record producer.

Life 

He was six years old when he received his first set of drums. From that point on he loved music.  After his Abitur in Mainz, his main subjects were germanistics, politics and philosophy, he worked as a mason and sculptor in the family company. After school, he earned his first money playing the drums in bands all through Germany. In 1976, CBS Frankfurt gave him the opportunity to work as a staff producer. He produced Red Baron with the frontman Candy DeRouge, with whom he continued working after the band broke up. He started writing songs for different kinds of groups and solo artists, like Roy Black and Tommy Steiner, before he discovered Jennifer Rush. In 1994, he sold his recording studios and moved to Cyprus, where he built his own house.

Gunther Mende's main residence is in Cyprus and periodically he lives in Tirol. He was married to Korean pianist Mee Eun Kim.

Work 

He produced stars like Céline Dion, Falco, Jennifer Rush and Tina Turner. Other European Groups he produced were Culcha Candela, Jan Vogler, Udo Lindenberg, Mireille Mathieu, Nena, Sally Oldfield, Helen Schneider, Anna Maria Kaufmann, Cassandra Steen, Bonnie Bianco, Bobby Kimball, Samy Deluxe, The Boss Hoss, Peter Maffay, Sabrina Weckerlin, Sarah Connor, DJ Ötzi, Roger Cicero, Aloha from Hell and David Garrett.

1984 he started his work with Jennifer Rush. Together with Candy de Rouge he produced two albums. Well known songs like “Ring of Ice“, “25 Lovers”, “Destiny” and “The Power of Love” stayed in the Charts up to 30 weeks.

1985 the album “Jennifer Rush” was in the German charts in second place. In the following year the album “Movin” reached first place and became album of the year. Both LPs were on the first and second chart position at the same time and have been successfully published in 16 different countries worldwide. They reached platinum and triple platinum and many different awards. 

1994 Gunther Mende produced Nena's album Und alles dreht sich.

1999 -2001 he worked as a production adviser and publisher for the “Rilke-Projekt” in which Rainer Maria Rilkes poems were read out loud by Mario Adorf, Peter Ustinov, Jessica Schwarz und Peter Maffay. These records have been underlaid with music and this project received a lot of awards too.

2007, 2008 and 2009 Gunther Mende developed “Dein Song”, a songwriter contest, for German television with his partner Alfred Bayer from the German production company BSB Film Wiesbaden. He was in the jury together with Joja Wendt, Johanna Klum, Frank Ziegler, Elin Skrzipczyk and Nadja Benaissa.

2009 he produced the album “Beyond” together with his wife Mee Eun Kim. On this album prayers were declaimed by Regula Curti, Dechen Shak-Dagsay and Tina Turner. This CD was published by Universal Classic, was released in the US, Canada, Japan and Korea and received platinum in Switzerland.  

Besides the treasured American ASCAP-Pop Awards, which was lent in Los Angeles, he received 17 gold, 12 platinum and three double platinum albums. He was also nominated for a Grammy with the song “The power of love” sung by Celine Dion.

2010 Gunther Mende has been in the charts with “The spirit never dies” the album of the dead singer Falco, on which there are unreleased songs. It was on first place in Austria and on third place in the German album charts and received both gold and platinum.

References 

"Songs wanted" issue 2/10 - Germany's leading song casting publication for professional songwriters and music publishers.

External links 
 http://www.discogs.com/artist/Gunther+Mende

1952 births
People from Wiesbaden
German record producers
German songwriters
Living people